WZRO-LP (93.1 FM) was a radio station formerly licensed to Suwannee, Florida, United States. The station was owned by Suwannee River Fishing Association.

The station's license was cancelled and its call sign deleted by the Federal Communications Commission on September 26, 2011.

References

External links
 

ZRO-LP
ZRO-LP
Radio stations disestablished in 2011
Defunct radio stations in the United States
2011 disestablishments in Florida
ZRO-LP